Rostislav Peterka (born 1 March 1949) is an Argentine rower. He competed in the men's coxed pair event at the 1968 Summer Olympics.

References

1949 births
Living people
Argentine male rowers
Olympic rowers of Argentina
Rowers at the 1968 Summer Olympics
Place of birth missing (living people)